Henry Sproatt (June 14, 1866 – October 4, 1934) was a Canadian architect who was prominent during the early 20th century. Born in Toronto, he trained in Europe and in New York City.

He formed a partnership in 1890 with another celebrated architect, John A. Pearson, and with Frank Darling in 1893. Sproatt parted ways in 1896 and formed a new firm in 1899 with Ernest Ross Rolph (1871–1958), named Sproatt & Rolph.

Sproatt was a Fellow of the Royal Institute of British Architects, and he died in Toronto in 1934. The firm continued under Ernest Rolph until 1942 and was then taken over by his son, Charles Beverley Sproatt (1896–1976), from 1958 until 1970.

In recognition of his architectural achievements the University of Toronto conferred the honorary degree of Doctor of Laws to Sproatt in 1920.

Notable projects

External links 
 

 Henry Sproatt
 Sproatt and Rolph in The Canadian Encyclopedia
 Sproatt and Rolph
 Soldier's Tower
 Hart House, U of T
 Knox Presbyterian Church and its *History
 Request for Heritage Review TRC
 University of Toronto Honorary Degree Recipients 1850–2016

1866 births
1934 deaths
Canadian architects
People from Old Toronto